The South Korea women's national basketball team is administered by the Korea Basketball Association.

History
Team South Korea’s greatest success was at the 1984 Los Angeles Summer Games, when they took silver. 

They finished fourth at the 2000 Summer Olympics and eighth at the 2008 Beijing Games.

In February 2020, South Korea qualified for the 2020 Summer Olympics through beating Great Britain during the FIBA Qualifying Tournament in Belgrade, Serbia. It is South Korea's first appearance at the tournament since 2008 Olympics in Beijing.
 
South Korea will play in group A alongside world No. 3 Spain, No. 4 Canada and No. 8 Serbia. The Koreans will look for at least one win in group A as the top two countries of each group advance to the quarterfinals.

Competitions

Olympic Games

FIBA World Cup

Asian Games

FIBA Asia Championship

Current roster
Roster for the 2022 FIBA Women's Basketball World Cup.

See also
South Korea women's national under-19 basketball team
South Korea women's national under-17 basketball team
South Korea women's national 3x3 team

References

External links

FIBA profile

 
Korea, South
National team